The 2017 European Curling Championships was held from November 17 to 25 in St Gallen,  Switzerland. The Group C competitions was held in May in Andorra.

At the conclusion of the championships, the top eight women's teams will go to the 2018 Ford World Women's Curling Championship in North Bay, Ontario, and the top eight men's teams will go to the 2018 World Men's Curling Championship in Las Vegas, United States.

Men

Group A
The Group A competitions will be contested at the Eissportzentrum Lerchenfeld in St. Gallen.

Teams

Round-robin standings
Final round-robin standings

{|
|valign=top width=10%|

Round-robin results

Draw 1
November 18, 9:00

Draw 3
November 18, 19:30

Draw 5
November 19, 13:00

Draw 7
November 20, 8:00

Draw 9
November 20, 16:00

Draw 11
November 21, 9:00

Draw 13
November 21, 19:00

Draw 15
November 22, 14:00

Draw 17
November 23, 9:00

World Challenge Games
The World Challenge Games are a best-of-three series held between the eighth-ranked team in the Group A round robin and the winner of the Group B tournament to determine which of these two teams will play at the World Championships.

Game 1
Friday, November 24, 19:00

Game 2
Saturday, November 25, 9:00

Playoffs

Semifinals
Thursday, November 23, 19:00

Bronze-medal game
Friday, November 24, 19:00

Gold-medal game
Saturday, November 25, 15:00

Player percentages
Round Robin only

Group B

Teams

Round-robin standings
Final round-robin standings

Relegation round

Playoffs

Quarterfinals
Thursday, November 23, 18:00

Semifinals
Friday, November 24, 8:00

Bronze-medal game
Friday, November 24, 13:00

Gold-medal game
Friday, November 24, 13:00

Group C

Teams

Men's Round-robin standings

  withdrew before competition started

Playoffs

1 vs. 2

Winner advances to Group B competitions.
Loser advances to Second Place Game.

3 vs. 4

Winner advances to Second Place Game.

Second Place Game

Winner advances to Group B competitions.

Women

Group A
The Group A competitions will be contested at the Eissportzentrum Lerchenfeld in St Gallen.

Teams

Round-robin standings
Final round-robin standings

Round-robin results

Draw 2
November 18, 14:00

Draw 4
November 19, 9:00

Draw 6
November 19, 19:00

Draw 8
November 20, 12:00

Draw 10
November 20, 20:00

Draw 12
November 21, 14:00

Draw 14
November 22, 9:00

Draw 16
November 22, 19:00

Draw 18
November 23, 14:00

World Challenge Games
The World Challenge Games are a best-of-three series held between the eighth-ranked team in the Group A round robin and the winner of the Group B tournament to determine which of these two teams will play at the World Championships.

Game 1
Friday, November 24, 19:00

Game 2
Saturday, November 25, 9:00

Game 3
Saturday, November 25, 14:00

Playoffs

Semifinals
Friday, November 24, 14:00

Bronze-medal game
Friday, November 24, 19:00

Gold-medal game
Saturday, November 25, 10:00

Player percentages
Round Robin only

Group B

Teams

Round-robin standings
Final round-robin standings

Round-robin results

Draw 1
Saturday, November 18, 14:00

Draw 2
Sunday, November 19, 8:00

Draw 3
Sunday, November 19, 16:00

Draw 4
Monday, November 20, 8:00

Draw 5
Monday, November 21, 16:00

Draw 6
Tuesday, November 21, 12:00 & Thursday November 23, 12:00

Draw 7
Tuesday, November 21, 20:00

Draw 8
Wednesday, November 22, 12:00

Draw 9
Wednesday, November 22, 20:00

Playoffs

Semifinals
Thursday, November 23, 18:00

Bronze-medal game
Friday, November 24, 13:30

Gold-medal game
Friday, November 24, 13:30

Group C

Teams

Women's Round-robin standings

Playoffs

1 vs. 2

Winner advances to Group B competitions.
Loser advances to Second Place Game.

3 vs. 4

Winner advances to Second Place Game.

Second Place Game

Winner advances to Group B competitions.

References
General
 
Specific

European Curling Championships
European Curling Championships
Curling competitions in Switzerland
International sports competitions hosted by Switzerland
Sport in St. Gallen (city)
European Curling Championships
European Curling Championships